Faber Birren (11 September 1900 – 30 December 1988) was an American writer and consultant on color and color theory.

Life
Faber Birren was born in Chicago, Illinois on 11 September 1900, the son of Joseph P. Birren, a landscape painter, and Crescentia (Lang) Birren, a pianist. He attended the Art Institute of Chicago while in high school and the University of Chicago for two years where he studied color theory.

He began publishing articles on color in 1924; his first book, Color in Vision was published in 1928.

In 1934 he established his own company and worked as an industrial color consultant, advising clients on the psychological effects of color on safety, employee morale, productivity and sales. His recommendations included changing wall and interior colors to reduce visual fatigue, and using bright colors on machinery to reduce accidents.  DuPont, Monsanto, and General Electric were among his clients as well as the military.

He also wrote extensively on color, writing forty books and over 250 articles on the subject.

Birren died in Stamford, Connecticut on 30 December 1988 after a stroke.

Personal
Birren married Wanda Martin and they had two daughters, Zoe and Fay.

Bibliography

 Color in Vision (1928).
 The Printers Art of Color (1934). Chicago: Crimson Press. 
 Color Psychology and Color Therapy (1950). New York: McGraw-Hill.
 New Horizons in Color (1955). New York: Reinhold Pub. Corp.
 Creative Color (1961). Van Nostrand Reinhold.
 Color in Your World (1962). New York: Crowell-Collier Publishing Co.
 Color: A Survey in Words and Pictures, from Ancient Mysticism to Modern Science (1963). New York: University Books. 
 History of Color in Painting (1965). New York: Reinhold Pub. Corp. lccn 64-22424 
 Principles of Color: A Review of Past Traditions and Modern Theories of Color Harmony (1969). Van Nostrand Reinhold. 
 Ostwald: The Color Primer (1969). Van Nostrand Reinhold. 
 Color and Human Response (1978). Van Nostrand Reinhold. 
 The Textile Colorist (1980). Van Nostrand Reinhold. 
 Light, Color, and Environment (1982) Van Nostrand Reinhold. 
 Color Perception in Art (1986). Schiffer Publishing.  
 The Symbolism of Color (1988). Citadel. 
 Light, Color, and Environment (1988). Schiffer Publishing. 
 The Elements of Color: A Treatise on the Color System of Johannes Itten Based on His Book The Art of Color (1970). Johannes Itten, and Faber Birren. New York: Van Nostrand Reinhold. 
 The Principles of Light and Color: The Classic Study of the Healing Power of Color (1967) by Edwin D. Babbitt; edited and annotated by Faber Birren. New York; University Books.

Legacy
In 1971, Birren donated nearly two hundred books about color, many of them rare, to the Yale University Library. He also established an endowment for color research.

References

External links 
 Faber Birren color-circle
 Review of The Principles of Light and Color

1900 births
1988 deaths
People from Chicago
Color scientists
American consultants
American writers
Writers from Chicago